Wasa Wasa is the debut album by the English psychedelic rock band Edgar Broughton Band. The album was originally released as "Harvest SHVL 757" in July 1969 and was produced by Peter Jenner.

Releases 
The 2004 CD reissue contained five previously unreleased bonus tracks, four of them being demos recorded by the band when they were a blues outfit called "The Edgar Broughton Blues Band". These tracks feature guitarist Victor Unitt, who left the band when they started to go into psychedelic rock, stating the members of the band to be "sell-outs". The last bonus track was a jamming session which was recorded on 21 January 1969, which was discovered when remastering the album.

Track listing
 "Death of an Electric Citizen" (Arthur Grant, Robert Edgar Broughton, Steve Broughton) – 6:09
 "American Boy Soldier" (Grant, R.E. Broughton, S. Broughton) – 4:22
 "Why Can't Somebody Love Me?" (Grant, R.E. Broughton, S. Broughton) – 5:05
 "Neptune" (S. Broughton) – 4:20
 "Evil" (R.E. Broughton) – 2:36
 "Crying" (R.E. Broughton) – 5:14
 "Love in the Rain" (R.E. Broughton) – 3:46
 "Dawn Crept Away" (R.E. Broughton, S. Broughton)– 14:07

2004 CD reissue bonus tracks
 "Messin' with the Kid" (Kelvin London) – 2:50
 "Waterloo Man" (R. E. Broughton) – 4:11
 "Jacqueline" (Big Bill Broonzy) – 3:41
 "Tellin' Everybody" (R. E. Broughton) – 2:28
 "Untitled Freak Out" (Grant, R.E. Broughton, S. Broughton) – 9:47

Personnel

Edgar Broughton Band
 Edgar Broughton – vocals, guitar
 Arthur Grant – bass, vocals
 Steve Broughton – drums

Additional musician
 Victor Unitt – guitar (bonus tracks 1-4)

Technical
 Peter Jenner – producer
 Peter Bown – engineer
Peter Mew – engineer
 Jim Epps – sleeve design
 John Hopkins – liner notes
 Dick Imrie – photography

References

1969 debut albums
Edgar Broughton Band albums
Albums produced by Peter Jenner
Harvest Records albums
Acid rock albums